Chharchung is a small village in Solukhumbu District in the Himalayas of Nepal. It lies to the southeast of the Gokyo Lakes and Gokyo village and north of Khumjung.

References

Populated places in Solukhumbu District
Himalayas
Khumbu Pasanglhamu